The Broken Penny is a 1953 thriller novel by the British writer Julian Symons set during the early Cold War.

Synopsis
After the Second World War, Professor Jacob Arbitzer rose to be president of an Eastern European country whose shape resembles a broken penny. Since overthrown by the Communists, the British government encourages him to return behind the Iron Curtain to lead an insurgency against the dictatorship. In turn, he demands he be accompanied by British former revolutionary Charles Garden.

References

Bibliography
 Miskimmin, Esme. 100 British Crime Writers. Springer Nature, 2020.
 Reilly, John M. Twentieth Century Crime & Mystery Writers. Springer, 2015.
 Walsdorf, John J. & Allen, Bonnie J. Julian Symons: A Bibliography. Oak Knoll Press, 1996.

1953 British novels
Novels by Julian Symons
British thriller novels
British spy novels
Victor Gollancz Ltd books